Meril-Prothom Alo Critics Choice Award for Best TV Actress is given by Meril-Prothom Alo as part of its annual Meril-Prothom Alo Awards for Bengali-language films actress.

Multiple winners
 2 Wins: Nusrat Imrose Tisha, Aupee Karim

Multiple nominees 
 5 Nominations: Nusrat Imrose Tisha
 4 Nominations: Jaya Ahsan
 3 Nominations: Aupee Karim
 2 Nominations: Sanjida Preeti

Winners and nominees

1990s

2000s

2010s

See also
 Meril-Prothom Alo Award for Best TV Actress
 Meril-Prothom Alo Critics Choice Award for Best Film Actress
 Meril-Prothom Alo Awards

References

External links

Critics Choice Award for Best TV Actress